Mariann Rácz (born 17 December 1959) is a former Hungarian-Austrian handball player. She won a silver medal with Hungary at the 1982 World Championship.

She competed at the 1992 Summer Olympics, where Austria placed 5th.

From 2010 to 2020, she was the goalkeeping coach at Érd HC.

Achievements
EHF Champions League:
Winner (7): 1982, 1989, 1990, 1992, 1993, 1994, 1995
Nemzeti Bajnokság I:
Winner (6): 1979, 1980, 1981, 1982, 1984, 1985
Magyar Kupa:
Winner (4): 1981, 1982, 1983, 1985
Women Handball Liga Austria:
Winner (8): 1989, 1990, 1991, 1992, 1993, 1994, 1995, 1996
ÖHB Cup:
Winner (7): 1990, 1991, 1992, 1993, 1994, 1995, 1996

Individual awards
 All-Star Team Best Goalkeeper of the Summer Olympics: 1992

Personal life
Her nephew is Ákos Kecskés, a Hungarian national football player.

References

External links

1959 births
Living people
Hungarian female handball players
Austrian female handball players
Olympic handball players of Austria
Handball players at the 1992 Summer Olympics
People from Nyíregyháza
Sportspeople from Szabolcs-Szatmár-Bereg County